Radcliffe Bridge railway station was a Railway Station in Radcliffe built on the Manchester, Bury and Rossendale Railway line, between Bury and Clifton, both in Greater Manchester.  It was opened on 25 September 1846, and was closed 7 July 1958.

History

Among the original stations was that at Radcliffe Bridge,  from Clifton Junction; it opened on 28 September, when public train services began. The station was located between the Sion Street bridge and Green Street bridge, immediately southeast of Grundy Street. There were two platforms and a siding on the west side of the tracks. The station building was on the east platform.

The station officially closed in 1959, although there had been no regular passenger service since 7 July 1958. Trains continued to pass through the station until 3 December 1966 when the railway was closed. No trace of the station now remains due to the construction of the A665 Pilkington Way, which cuts through the line of the railway.

See also
East Lancashire Railway 1844-1859

References

Further reading
 - includes an image of the station

Disused railway stations in the Metropolitan Borough of Bury
Former Lancashire and Yorkshire Railway stations
Railway stations in Great Britain opened in 1846
Railway stations in Great Britain closed in 1958
Radcliffe, Greater Manchester
1846 establishments in England